Felipe "Tres" Barrera III (born September 15, 1994) is an American professional baseball catcher in the St. Louis Cardinals organization. He has played in Major League Baseball (MLB) for the Washington Nationals.

Early life and amateur career
Barrera was born in Eagle Pass, Texas and grew up there until his family moved to the Rio Grande Valley when he was ten years old. He attended Sharyland High School, where he played both football and baseball. He played college baseball at the University of Texas. In 2014, he played collegiate summer baseball with the Cotuit Kettleers of the Cape Cod Baseball League, and returned to the league in 2015 to play for the Orleans Firebirds. As a junior, Barrera was named honorable mention All-Big 12 Conference after batting .289 with six home runs, 17 doubles, 35 runs scored and 37 runs batted in.

Professional career

Washington Nationals

Minor leagues
Barrera was drafted in the 6th round (184th overall) by the Washington Nationals in the 2016 MLB Draft. After signing with the Nationals he was assigned to the Auburn Doubledays of Class A Short Season New York–Penn League, where he hit .244 with three home runs and 17 RBIs in 48 games. He batted .278 with eight home runs and 27 RBIs and 28 runs scored in 67 games the following season for Hagerstown Suns of the Class A South Atlantic League, although his playing time was limited due to a broken finger on his throwing hand. He spent the 2018 season with the Class A-Advanced Potomac Nationals, slashing .263/.334/.386 with six home runs, 36 runs scored and 24 driven in and was named a Carolina League All-Star. He was selected by the Nationals to play in the Arizona Fall League for Salt River Rafters after the end of the season. Barrera participated in 2019 spring training as a member of the Major League camp, but was assigned to the Double-A Harrisburg Senators for the season, hitting .249/.323/.381/.704 with 8 home runs and 46 RBI.

Major Leagues
The Nationals selected Barrera's contract on September 8, 2019. He made his Major League debut on September 14, 2019, against the Atlanta Braves, lining out in a pinch-hit at bat. Barrera played in two games with the Nationals in 2019, going hitless in two at-bats. The Nationals finished with a 93–69 record in 2019, good enough to clinch a wild card spot. Barrera did not take part in any postseason action as the Nationals went on to win the World Series over the Houston Astros, their first in franchise history.

On July 24, 2020, Barrera was suspended 80 games for testing positive for dehydrochlormethyltestosterone. He appealed the decision and his suspension was reduced to the duration of the 2020 season, after which he was reinstated from the restricted list.

On July 19, 2021, Barrera hit his first MLB home run for the Nationals, a solo blast off of Miami Marlins pitcher Ross Detwiler. Appearing in 30 games for Washington in 2021, Barrera logged a .264/.374/.385 batting line with 2 home runs and 10 RBI.

In 2022, Barrera appeared in 19 games for the Nationals, batting .180/.212/.200 with no home runs and 4 RBI. The majority of his season was spent with the Triple-A Rochester Red Wings, where he slashed .254/.338/.424 with 7 home runs and 25 RBI. He elected free agency on November 10, 2022.

St. Louis Cardinals
On January 20, 2023, Barrera signed a minor league contract with the St. Louis Cardinals organization.

Personal
Barrera is of Mexican descent and is fluent in both English and Spanish.

Barrera's wife, Lindsey, gave birth to the couple's first child, a son, in 2020, but he died the same day. Their daughter was born in 2022.

References

External links

Texas Longhorns bio

1994 births
Living people
American baseball players of Mexican descent
American sportspeople in doping cases
Auburn Doubledays players
Baseball players from Texas
Cotuit Kettleers players
Hagerstown Suns players
Harrisburg Senators players
Leones del Escogido players
American expatriate baseball players in the Dominican Republic
Major League Baseball catchers
Major League Baseball players suspended for drug offenses
Orleans Firebirds players
People from Eagle Pass, Texas
Potomac Nationals players
Rochester Red Wings players
Salt River Rafters players
Texas Longhorns baseball players
Washington Nationals players